The President of Zanzibar is the head of the Revolutionary Government of Zanzibar, which is a semi-autonomous government within Tanzania. The current president is Hussein Mwinyi. The president is also the chairman of the Revolutionary Council, whose members are appointed by the president, and some of which must be selected from the House of Representatives.

The president is elected by a plurality. Presidential terms are for five years, and a candidate may be re-elected only once.

Following the Zanzibar Revolution in 1964, Abeid Karume became the first president of Zanzibar, as leader of the Afro-Shirazi Party.

List of presidents of Zanzibar

President of the People's Republic of Zanzibar

Presidents of the Revolutionary Government of Zanzibar

Notes

See also
Tanzania
Politics of Tanzania
List of governors of Tanganyika
President of Tanzania
List of heads of state of Tanzania
Prime Minister of Tanzania
List of prime ministers of Tanzania
List of sultans of Zanzibar
List of heads of government of Zanzibar
Vice President of Zanzibar
Lists of office-holders

References

External links
World Statesmen - Zanzibar
 Government of Zanzibar

Zanzibar
Zanzibar
Government of Zanzibar
Zanzibar Presidents
Zanzibar-related lists